Putnam Transit or Putnam Area Rapid Transit (PART) is the provider of bus transit in Putnam County, New York. An agency of the Putnam County government, Putnam Transit came into service in the mid-1970s as a startup system in the wake of growing suburbanization of Putnam County and rising gas prices.

Vehicles and routes are owned by Putnam County, and service is provided under contract to the county by MV Transportation.

Routes
Putnam Transit currently operates four year-round routes, all of which meet at various points during the day at Putnam Plaza, a strip mall in the county seat of Carmel.  There is also a seasonal tourist trolley service in Cold Spring.  A sixth route is catered towards Metro North commuters going to New York via the Harlem Line. All routes run Monday-Saturday, unless otherwise noted.

Putnam Transit also operates the ADA-mandated paratransit service for those unable to use regular route service due to disabilities, as well as pupil transportation service using yellow school buses. Until the end of 2006, a fifth route (PART 4) ran three days a week from Carmel to Jefferson Valley Mall, Cortlandt Town Center, then continuing on Route 9 through western Putnam County and then serving the commercial strip on that route in southern Dutchess County before ending at Poughkeepsie Galleria. With the discontinuing of the PART 4, western Putnam County was left without local transit service (except for the seasonal Cold Spring trolley).

Connections
PART has connection points with several transit agencies from adjacent areas.
Bee-Line Bus System: PT 2 terminates at Jefferson Valley Mall in Yorktown Heights, connecting with Bee-Line route 16 (the 12 used to go there as well, before it was truncated to Armonk). PART buses also meet buses on Bee-Line route 77, an express route from White Plains to Mahopac.
Housatonic Area Regional Transit: PT 1 connects with, depending on time of day, HART's Danbury-Brewster shuttle or HART route 3 in Brewster.
Metro-North Railroad connections to the Harlem Line can be made via PT 1 at Brewster, PT 3 at Patterson, or with the Croton Falls Shuttle at Croton Falls.

References

External links
Putnam Transit Homepage

Surface transportation in Greater New York
Bus transportation in New York (state)
Transportation in Putnam County, New York